Hypanua is a genus of moths of the family Erebidae. The genus was erected by George Hampson in 1913.

Species
Hypanua dinawa Bethune-Baker, 1906
Hypanua roseitincta Hampson, 1918
Hypanua xylina Distant, 1898

References

Catocalinae